Seymour de Ricci (1881-1942) was a bibliographer and historian, who was born in England and raised and became a citizen of France.

Early years 
Seymour Montefiore Robert Rosso de Ricci was born in 1881 in Twickenham, United Kingdom. His parents were Helen Montefiore (c. 1860–1931) and James Herman de Ricci (1847–1900). He lived with his mother in Paris after 1890, when his parents divorced. His father was a colonial judge and a lawyer.

Education and early career 
Between 1890 and 1898, de Ricci attended the Lycée Janson de Sailly. He attended and subsequently received his bachelier ès lettres from École pratique des hautes études, Sorbonne in 1897. He went to Côtes-du-Nord, Brittany where he studied Roman inscriptions. He met Salomon Reinach, who would be a close friend and mentor, and Émile Guimet. He took an inventory of the inscriptions and published his first book about them in 1897. In 1901 he received his licence. He was a private scholar of epigraphy, Egyptology and bibliography.

Personal life and the war 
De Ricci became a French citizen in 1901. He married Jenny Gabrielle Thérèse Dreyfus about 1902. She was born about 1886 and died about 1938.

During World War I, he was a French Army second-class chasseur à pied. He was an interpreter for the British later in the war. After the war, de Ricci divorced Jenny and he married Delphine Levy Feher in 1920. She was born about 1886 and died about 1977.

Death 
De Ricci died in Suresnes, near Paris, France in 1942.

Publications 
A selection of de Ricci's works include the following:

Sole author

Co-author

Digitized notes 
Notes from de Ricci have been digitized for an online database, Seymour de Ricci Bibliotheca Britannica Manuscripta Digitized Archive. The notes, at the University of London's Senate House Library, had been intended for publishing of Bibliotheca Britannica Manuscripta, which was not completed. They had been originally bequeathed to the Historical Research in London in the form of more than 60,000 index cards.

References

Further reading

External links
 

20th-century French historians
French bibliographers
1881 births
1942 deaths
French Army soldiers
French people of World War I
French military personnel of World War I
French male non-fiction writers
20th-century French male writers